Hausdorff may refer to:

 A Hausdorff space, when used as an adjective, as in "the real line is Hausdorff"
 Felix Hausdorff (1868–1942), the German mathematician after whom Hausdorff spaces are named
 Hausdorff dimension, a measure theoretic concept of dimension
 Hausdorff distance or Hausdorff metric, which measures how far two compact non-empty subsets of a metric space are from each other
 Hausdorff density
 Hausdorff maximal principle
 Hausdorff measure
 Hausdorff moment problem
 Hausdorff paradox